Jane Theresa Wrightson (born 2 January 1958) is New Zealand's Retirement Commissioner. She was previously New Zealand's eighth Chief Censor, and first woman Chief Censor, from 1991 to 1993, when Films, Videos, and Publications Act became law.

Early life and family
Wrightson was born in Hastings on 2 January 1958, the daughter of Pearl Wrightson (née French) and Trevor Wrightson. She was educated at Hastings Girls' High School from 1971 to 1975, before going on to university. She completed a Bachelor of Arts in English at Victoria University of Wellington in 1979, a Diploma in Business Administration at Massey University in 1985, and a Master of Business Administration with Distinction at Massey in 1994.

Career

Early career
Wrightson worked for a decade for TVNZ, including in the programming department, and was head of commissioned programmes from 1989 to 1991.

Chief Censor
Between 1991 and 1994, Wrightson served as Chief Film Censor. Wrightson wrote in 1992 that her “strong will has been a blessing and a curse to me.  The strength is needed as a film censor – there are so many individuals and groups pulling in so many different directions that after absorbing all the approaches one simply has to go with instincts, consultation and a healthy dollop of common sense.”

In 1992, Wrightson banned Henry: Portrait of a Serial Killer, calling it a “stalk and slash” movie too violent for New Zealand screens.  This was the first mainstream film to be banned from exhibition at the Wellington Film Festival, whose director called her too conservative.  The film was later passed, with cuts, on video by the Video Recordings Authority.  Earlier that year, she passed, as R18, the Australian tantric sex film Sacred Sex which was appealed unsuccessfully to the Film and Video Board of Review by the Society for the Promotion of Community Standards who viewed her classification as too liberal.

Later career
Having unsuccessfully applied to continue as Chief Censor after Parliament passed the Films, Videos, and Publications Act 1993, Wrightson became television programme manager, and soon deputy chief executive, of New Zealand On Air in 1994. She then became chief executive of the Screen Production and Development Association (SPADA) in 1999, and chief executive of the Broadcasting Standards Authority in 2003,. Between 2007 and 2019 Wrightson was  Chief Executive of funding body New Zealand On Air. In February 2020 she took up the role of Retirement Commissioner for a three-year term.

Wrightson is also a chartered member of the New Zealand Institute of Directors, and a trustee of the Digital Media Trust that set up NZ screen history and culture site NZ On Screen.

Other activities
Wrightson retired from the Board of Netball New Zealand in 2007 after an eight-year stint, and served on the Swimming NZ Board for five years until 2012. She was also a film reviewer for the Evening Post newspaper in Wellington from 1994.

References

1958 births
Living people
Massey University alumni
Chief Censors of New Zealand
Victoria University of Wellington alumni
People from Hastings, New Zealand
21st-century New Zealand public servants